Soccer Killer is a 2017 Chinese comedy film directed by Jeffrey Lau, and starring He Jiong, Gillian Chung, Charlene Choi, Joey Yung, and Patrick Tam.

Cast
 He Jiong as Maocilang
 Gillian Chung as Princess Changping
 Charlene Choi
 Joey Yung
 Patrick Tam
 Stephy Tang
 Wang Xuebing
 Lam Chi-chung
 Jeffrey Lau

Production
Principal photography started on April 8, 2014 in Hengdian World Studios and wrapped in May 2014.

References

2017 films
Chinese action comedy films
Films set in the Song dynasty
Chinese association football films
2010s sports comedy films
Films directed by Jeffrey Lau
2017 comedy films
Chinese sports comedy films